Marendol is a small settlement in the hills east of Tržišče in the Municipality of Sevnica in central Slovenia. The area is part of the traditional region of Lower Carniola and is included in the Lower Sava Statistical Region.

History
Marendol was part of the village of Zgornje Vodale until 2015, when it was separated and made an independent settlement in its own right.

References

External links
Marendol at Geopedia

Populated places in the Municipality of Sevnica